The 1962 United States Senate election in South Dakota took place on November 6, 1962. Incumbent Republican Senator Francis H. Case ran for re-election to a third term. He won the Republican primary against Attorney General A. C. Miller, but shortly after the primary, died. The Republican State Central Committee named Lieutenant Governor Joseph H. Bottum as Case's replacement on the ballot, and Governor Archie Gubbrud appointed Bottum to fill the vacancy caused by Case's death. In the general election, Bottum was opposed by Democratic nominee George McGovern, the Director of Food for Peace and the former U.S. Congressman from South Dakota's 1st congressional district. The contest between Bottum and McGovern was quite close, with McGovern narrowly defeating him for re-election by just 597 votes, making him the first Democrat to win a Senate election in South Dakota since William J. Bulow's win in 1936.

Democratic Primary

Candidates
Former Lieutenant Governor John F. Lindley announced that he would run for the U.S. Senate, but dropped out of the race when former Congressman George McGovern, who briefly served in the Kennedy administration as Director of Food for Peace, announced that he would run. McGovern was the only Democratic candidate to file for the race, and the primary election did not appear on the ballot.

Republican Primary

Candidates
 Francis H. Case, incumbent U.S. senator
 A. C. Miller, South Dakota Attorney General

Results

Several weeks after winning the Republican primary, Senator Case died in office. The Republican Party of South Dakota named Lieutenant Governor Joseph H. Bottum as Case's replacement on the ballot, and Governor Gubbrud appointed him as Case's successor.

General election

Results

References

South Dakota
1962
1962 South Dakota elections